Stanisława Walasiewicz (3 April 1911 – 4 December 1980), also known as Stefania Walasiewicz, and Stella Walsh, was a Polish-American track and field athlete, who became a women's Olympic champion in the 100 metres. Born in Poland and raised in the United States, she became an American citizen in 1947.

Background
Walasiewicz was born on 3 April 1911 in Wierzchownia (now Brodnica County), Congress Poland. Her family emigrated to the United States when she was three months old. Her parents, Julian and Veronika Walasiewicz, settled in Cleveland, Ohio, where her father found a job as a steel mill worker. Her family called her Stasia, a common Polish diminutive of her Christian name, which later led to the nickname Stella, as she was known in the United States.

Athletic career
Walasiewicz started her athletic career at South High School, a school located in the historic Slavic Village neighborhood on the east side of Cleveland, Ohio. In 1927, she qualified for a place on the American Olympic team started by the Cleveland Press newspaper. However, Walasiewicz was not an American citizen and could not obtain citizenship under the age of 21, so she could not compete. The success of Halina Konopacka, a Polish athlete who won gold in the discus throw at the 1928 Summer Olympics, inspired Walasiewicz to join the local branch of Sokół, a Polish sports and patriotic organization active among the Polish diaspora. During the Pan-Slavic meeting of the  movement in Poznań, she scored her first major international victories; she won five gold medals in the 60 metre, 100 metre, 200 metre and 400 metre races, as well as the long jump. She was asked to stay in Poland and join the Polish national athletic team, and she continued to run in American challenges and games.

Walasiewicz continued to compete as an amateur, while also working as a clerk in Cleveland. In the period leading up to the 1932 Summer Olympics, she won American national championships in the 100-yard dash (1930), 220 yard dash (1930–31), and long jump (1930). For her part in interstate athletic championships, the city of Cleveland awarded her a car. She was offered American citizenship; however, just two days prior to taking her oath of citizenship, she changed her mind and instead adopted Polish citizenship, offered to her by the Polish consulate in New York.

In the 1932 Summer Olympics, Walasiewicz represented Poland. In the 100 m dash, Walasiewicz equaled the current world record of 11.9 seconds and won the gold medal. On the same day, she finished 6th out of 9 in the discus throw event. Upon her return to Poland, she almost instantly became a well-known personality. She was welcomed by crowds in the port of Gdynia, and a few days later, she was awarded the Golden Cross of Merit for her achievements. She was again chosen the most popular Polish person in sports, and held that title for three years.

In the spring of 1933, Walasiewicz appeared at the Championships of Warsaw, where she seized 9 gold medals in track and field, including 80 metres hurdling, 4 × 200 relay, and long jump. On 17 September 1933, in Poznań, she beat two world records in one day: 7.4 seconds for the 60 m and 11.8 seconds for the 100 m. Her Olympic success also won her a scholarship at the Warsaw Institute of Physical Education, where she met some of the most notable Polish athletes of the time, including Jadwiga Wajs, Felicja Schabińska, Maria Kwaśniewska, and Janusz Kusociński.

In the 1936 Olympics in Berlin, Walasiewicz attempted to defend her Olympic title for the 100 m dash, but Helen Stephens of the U.S. beat her by 0.02 seconds; Walasiewicz won the silver medal. Stephens was accused by a Polish newspaper reporter of being male and was forced to submit to a genital inspection which confirmed her gender as female.

After the Olympic Games, Walasiewicz moved to the U.S. and resumed her amateur career. During and after World War II, she won American national championships in the 100 metres (1943, 1944 and 1948), the 200 metres (1939–40 and 1942–1948), the discus throw (1941–42), and the long jump (1938–1946, 1948 and 1951).

In 1947, she accepted American citizenship, and she later married aviation draftsman Harry Olson in 1956. Although the marriage did not last long, she continued to use the name Stella Walsh Olson for the rest of her life. She won her last U.S. title in 1951, at the age of 40. She was inducted into the U.S. Track and Field Hall of Fame in 1975.

Post-athletic career
After her retirement, she continued to be active in a variety of Polish sport associations in the U.S., where she organized championships and helped young athletes. She also funded a variety of awards for Polish sports people living in America. In 1974, Stella Walsh was inducted into the National Polish-American Sports Hall of Fame. Stella Walsh was a contestant on the 16 June 1954 episode of the radio quiz program You Bet Your Life, hosted by Groucho Marx.

Death and controversy
Walsh was killed during an armed robbery in a parking lot in Cleveland, on 4 December 1980. She was buying ribbons for a welcoming ceremony for visiting Polish basketball players.  An autopsy showed that she had no uterus, an abnormal urethra, and a non-functioning, underdeveloped penis, although some sources suggest she also displayed female characteristics. Chromosome analysis revealed that most of her cells contained normal X and Y (male) chromosomes but some were X0 (containing only one X chromosome), resulting in XY gonadal dysgenesis.

The controversy of her biological sex remains unresolved, and the situation is further complicated as many earlier documents, including her birth record, state that she was female; the Cuyahoga County coroner, Samuel Gerber, stated that Walasiewicz was "socially, culturally and legally" a woman. There has also been controversy over whether her records and achievements should be erased.

Legacy
In Cleveland, on Broadway Avenue, there is a city-owned recreational center named after Stella Walsh. It is attached to Cleveland South High School. She is buried in Calvary Cemetery in Cleveland, Ohio.

Walasiewicz was discussed on BBC Radio 4's The Long View in April 2019 when the contentious issue was the "Gender in women's sport".

See also
Gender verification in sports

References

External links

Stella Walsh: A Documentary

1911 births
1980 deaths
1980 murders in the United States
Intersex sportspeople
Intersex women
American female sprinters
Polish female sprinters
Sportspeople from Kuyavian-Pomeranian Voivodeship
People from Brodnica County
Track and field athletes from Cleveland
Olympic athletes of Poland
Olympic gold medalists for Poland
Olympic silver medalists for Poland
Athletes (track and field) at the 1932 Summer Olympics
Athletes (track and field) at the 1936 Summer Olympics
European Athletics Championships medalists
Sex verification in sports
Congress Poland emigrants to the United States
Deaths by firearm in Ohio
People murdered in Ohio
Burials in Calvary Cemetery (Cleveland)
Medalists at the 1936 Summer Olympics
Medalists at the 1932 Summer Olympics
Polish people murdered abroad
Olympic gold medalists in athletics (track and field)
Olympic silver medalists in athletics (track and field)
Women's World Games medalists
Polish LGBT sportspeople
LGBT track and field athletes
USA Outdoor Track and Field Championships winners
USA Indoor Track and Field Championships winners
20th-century American women
Olympic female sprinters
20th-century LGBT people